Sniper Ghost Warrior Contracts 2 is a 2021 tactical shooter stealth video game developed and published by CI Games. It is the sixth entry in the Sniper: Ghost Warrior series and is the sequel to Sniper Ghost Warrior Contracts. The game was released on 4 June 2021 for Microsoft Windows, PlayStation 4, Xbox One and Xbox Series X/S. A version for PlayStation 5 was released on 24 August 2021.

Gameplay 
Sniper Ghost Warrior Contracts 2 refines the gameplay of its predecessor, Sniper Ghost Warrior Contracts. The game and its DLCs feature a total of six missions, distinctly categorized as either "classic" and "long-distance."

Plot 

As in the previous game, the plot is about overthrowing a tyrannical government. The game is set in the fictional Middle Eastern country of Kuamar. The game's protagonist, Raven, and his handler, Alex, are not connected to the previous game.

Development
Sniper Ghost Warrior Contracts 2 was developed by Polish video game developer CI Games, the developer of the Sniper: Ghost Warrior series. The development began shortly after its predecessor Sniper Ghost Warrior Contracts.

Release
The game was released on Microsoft Windows, PlayStation 4, Xbox One, and Xbox Series X/S on 4 June 2021. It was released on PlayStation 5 on 24 August 2021.

Reception

According to review aggregator Metacritic, Sniper Ghost Warrior Contracts 2 received "mixed or average reviews" for the PC, PlayStation 4, and Xbox Series X versions, while the PlayStation 5 version received "generally favorable" reviews.

GameStars Sascha Penzhorn scored the game 75 out of 100, writing the game is for those who "enjoy planning perfect long-distance shots", but criticizing the story and the inclusion of microtransactions in a single-player game.

eXputer reviewer Huzaifah Durrani wrote the gameplay excelled at presenting creative scenarios for killing a target. Rick Lane of PC Gamer also has the impression that killing targets without raising alarm is like a puzzle to solve. He has an impression that after making five Ghost Warrior games CI Games "clearly understands the experience it's after". The PCGamer reviewer perceives infiltrating enemy base as James Bond missions, but also writes "The sniping feels authentic". He praises animation, environment design, weapon handling, writing and voice acting. He also likes the size of levels in the game ("Some locations you visit, such as a giant medieval castle that has both an inner and outer fort, would form the entire level in any other game").

JeuxVideo praises tutorial, which is good both for acquainted with Sniper Ghost Warrior Contracts and for newcomers. They also praise "the quality of the level design". They write: "Obviously, the clichés of video game infiltration, with the eternal tall grass, are present". They also praise the array of gadgets to use. They write that "killcam lovers will be able to have fun", however they write that headshots are "particularly gory" and "the PEGI 18 on the jacket is there not by accident".

As far as newly introduced long-distance shooting in the game is concerned, JeuxVideo thinks it "is an excellent idea". IGN reviewer Tristan Ogilvie thinks such kills are "the strongest sections of Contracts 2" and they remain thrilling long after bloodiness of kills wears off, however he thinks that returning fire from long distance with assault rifles "admittedly shatters the sense of realism somewhat".

As far as AI is concerned, JeuxVideo writes: "Overall, AI has become more realistic, but unfortunately it happens that it goes off the rails". IGN reviewer admits the guards use a bit of strategy, but generally has an impression their stupidity makes them too easy to kill.

At the Pixel Heaven 2021 game festival, the game was nominated in the categories "Best Audio", "Big Fish Grand Prix" and "Best Gameplay".

References

External links
 

2021 video games
CryEngine games
Multiplayer and single-player video games
PlayStation 4 games
PlayStation 5 games
Sniper: Ghost Warrior
Sniper video games
Stealth video games
Tactical shooter video games
Video games developed in Poland
Video games set in a fictional country
Video game sequels
Windows games
Xbox One games
Xbox Series X and Series S games
CI Games games